Ruslan Yarkulovich Uzakov (born 6 March 1967) is an Uzbekistani football manager and a former player. He also holds Russian citizenship.

External links
 
 

1967 births
People from Navoiy Region
Living people
Soviet footballers
Association football defenders
Pakhtakor Tashkent FK players
Uzbekistani footballers
FC Torpedo Zaporizhzhia players
Uzbekistani expatriate footballers
Expatriate footballers in Ukraine
Ukrainian Premier League players
FC Shakhtar Donetsk players
FC Orenburg players
Uzbekistani football managers
Uzbekistani expatriate sportspeople in Ukraine
Uzbekistan international footballers
FC Nosta Novotroitsk players